Mayaphaenops sbordonii is a species of beetle in the family Carabidae, the only species in the genus Mayaphaenops.

References

Trechinae